Alaska is officially covered by two time zones - the Alaska Time Zone and the Hawaii-Aleutian Time Zone. The Hawaii-Aleutian Time Zone is used for the Aleutian Islands west of 169°30′W (Islands of Four Mountains, Andreanof Islands, Rat Islands and Near Islands), and the rest of the state uses the Alaska Time Zone. The entirety of Alaska observes daylight saving time.

The town of Hyder, because it essentially is a single town split by the border between the United States and Canada, unofficially observes Pacific Time including DST (UTC−08:00, DST UTC−07:00) like its neighbor Stewart, British Columbia, with the exception of the U.S. Post Office (because it is a federal facility).

History
As part of Russian America, Alaska used the Julian calendar and the same day of the week as Asia. In 1867, Alaska became a United States territory (through the Alaska Purchase) and began using the Gregorian calendar and the same day of the week as the Americas. The switch was achieved by repeating the same day of the week and skipping eleven days of the month, so that the purchase date of Friday, October 6 (Julian) was followed by Friday, October 18 (Gregorian).

Before time zones were introduced, every place used local observation of the sun to set its clocks, which meant that every location used a different local mean time based on its longitude. For example, Sitka, the capital of Alaska at the time, at longitude 135°20′W, had a local time equivalent to UTC+14:59 under Russia and UTC−09:01 under the United States.

In 1900, "Alaska Standard Time" was established within the state as UTC−09:00.

In 1918, the United States Congress passed the Standard Time Act, which defined a standard time zone for Alaska - United States Standard Alaska Time, set at UTC−10:00.

On January 20, 1942, all of the United States, including Alaska, began to observe War Time. Standard time in the United States advanced by one hour and would remain so until September 25, 1945, when the act was repealed.

In 1966, Congress passed the Uniform Time Act. The Uniform Time Act introduced Daylight Saving Time uniformly in the United States, which Alaska would begin observing on April 28, 1968. The Uniform Time Act also defined four time zones that Alaska would use:

 Bering Standard Time (UTC−11:00), used by the west coast (including Nome) and the Aleutian Islands.
 Alaska-Hawaii Standard Time (UTC−10:00), used by most of Alaska, including Anchorage and Fairbanks.
 Yukon Standard Time (UTC−09:00), used by Yakutat.
 Pacific Standard Time (UTC−08:00), used by Southeast Alaska, including Juneau.

On October 30, 1983, Alaska switched to using only two time zones. Areas east of Unalaska began using the Yukon Time Zone (UTC−09:00). Most of the Aleutian Islands, previously on Bering Time, were now using Alaska-Hawaii Time. As an act of Congress was required to change the name of the time zones, the time zones did not gain their modern names (Alaska Time and Hawaii-Aleutian Time) until November 30, 1984.

tz database
The tz database version  contains seven time zones for Alaska for historical reasons. Only three (America/Adak, America/Anchorage, and America/Metlakatla) are currently in use.

References

Alaska
Geography of Alaska